Thomas Dufter (born 20 December 1966 in Inzell) is a former German nordic combined skier who competed during the late 1980s and early 1990s. He won a bronze medal in the 3 x 10 km team event at the 1993 FIS Nordic World Ski Championships in Falun.

Dufter's lone individual victory was in a World Cup event at Planica, Yugoslavia in 1990.

References

1966 births
Living people
German male Nordic combined skiers
Olympic Nordic combined skiers of Germany
Nordic combined skiers at the 1992 Winter Olympics
Nordic combined skiers at the 1994 Winter Olympics
FIS Nordic World Ski Championships medalists in Nordic combined
People from Traunstein (district)
Sportspeople from Upper Bavaria